Badessa may refer to:
 Badessa, Oromia, a town in the Oromia region of Ethiopia
 Bedessa, Wolaita, a town in the SNNPR region of Ethiopia
 Badessa (harvestman), a genus of arachnids in the family Samoidae

See also 
 Badesse, a village in Tuscany, Italy
 , a village in Rosciano, Abruzzo, Italy
 , 16th-century Italian humanist
 Bedessa (disambiguation)